Chris Huffins (born 15 April 1970) is an athlete from the United States who competed in the field of Decathlon.  He was the Director and Head Coach of the Men's and Women's Track and Field and Cross Country programs at the University of California from 2002 to 2007.  He married Monique Parker in 1997 with whom he had one son Zachary. He earned a degree from the University of California in Political Economies of Industrial Societies in 2007.  Huffins is a member of Alpha Phi Alpha fraternity. He is currently married to Tamika Huffins with whom he had another son, Jaxon.

Athletic career
Chris Huffins first became interested in decathlon while a student at the University of California. Sidelined with a broken toe, he watched other students performing decathlon and decided that that was the sport for him. Before becoming a decathlete, Chris Huffins was also a basketball player, sprinter, and long jumper.

As a decathlete, Huffins acquired a reputation as a fast starter but a slow finisher, prone to surging ahead on the first day of the competition, but fading on the second day. Huffins denied this accusation, saying that it was an accident of ordering because his two weakest events (javelin, 1500m run) happened to be the final two events of the decathlon.

Achievements
1992 Olympic Trials - decathlon - 16th
1993 NCAA - decathlon - 1st
1993 USA Outdoor Track & Field Championships - decathlon - 9th
1993 Pacific-10 Conference, decathlon - 1st
1993 Ranked by Track and Field News decathlon - 9th U.S.
1995 USA Outdoor Track & Field Championships - decathlon - 2nd
1995 1995 World Championships in Athletics Ullevi Stadium, Gothenburg, Sweden - decathlon - 8th
1995 Ranked by Track and Field News decathlon - 8th World, 2nd U.S.
1996 Olympic Trials - decathlon - 3rd
1996 1996 Summer Olympics Atlanta, Georgia, U.S. - decathlon - 10th
1996 Ranked by Track and Field News decathlon - 10th World, 3rd U.S.
1997 USA Outdoor Track & Field Championships - decathlon - 2nd
1997 Ranked by Track and Field News decathlon - 7th World, 2nd U.S.
1998 USA Outdoor Track & Field Championships - decathlon - 1st
1998 Deca Jam, - decathlon - 1st
1998 Goodwill Games, - decathlon - 2nd
1998 Ranked by Track and Field News decathlon - 5th World, 2nd U.S.
1998 Recipient of the John H. Bennett Award presented by USA Track & Field
1999 USA Outdoor Track & Field Championships - decathlon - 1st
1999 Pan Am Games - decathlon - 1st
1999 World Championships - decathlon - 3rd
1999 Recipient of the John H. Bennett Award presented by USA Track & Field
2000 Olympic Trials - decathlon - 2nd
2000 2000 Summer Olympics Sydney, Australia - decathlon - 3rd
2000 Ranked by Track and Field News decathlon - 4th World, 1st U.S.
2000 Inducted into the Indiana State Track & Field Hall of Fame
2000 Recipient of the John H. Bennett Award presented by USA Track and Field

Huffins holds  the heptathlon world best in the 60 m dash with a time of 6.61 seconds.

2000 Sydney Olympics
Leading into the Sydney Games, Huffins established himself as one of the best decathletes in the world.  In 1998, he finished second in the Goodwill Games, and in 1999, Huffins won the Pan American Games and finished third at the 1999 World Championships in the decathlon.  At the 2000 USA Olympic trials, Huffins finished second behind Tom Pappas and ahead of Kip Janvrin, his future teammates at Sydney.

At the Sydney Olympics, Huffins performed consistently, and after the first nine events, including the javelin, he led eventual winner Erki Nool by 14 points. In the concluding 1500m event, Huffins ran a hard race, beating his previous best time by almost 13 seconds.  It was enough to capture the bronze medal.  Huffins score was a season's best of 8595 points and only 46 points short of gold medalist Erki Nool.

On the topic of not winning the gold medal, Huffins later said there were as many bronze medals as gold medals, so he didn't feel any less honored for finishing third.

Coaching career
After spending some time as an assistant coach for Wake Forest University in Winston-Salem, North Carolina and Georgia Tech in Atlanta, Georgia, Huffins was hired at his alma mater, the University of California, to coach his old team, The Golden Bears.  Under his direction, the team has won 14 All-American honors, set 12 new school records, sent five athletes to the 2004 Summer Olympics, and in 2005, two of Huffin's athletes were ranked in the top 10 in the United States.

On May 29, 2007, Huffins announced his resignation from his position as director of track and field at the University of California.

After brief stints at Boise State University, Eastern Michigan University, the University of Oklahoma & Clemson, he is currently (2014-2015) going into his second year coaching the Purdue Boilermakers.

References

trackfield.brinkster
New York Times
Decathlon2000 Bio

1970 births
Living people
American male decathletes
Athletes (track and field) at the 1999 Pan American Games
Athletes (track and field) at the 1996 Summer Olympics
Athletes (track and field) at the 2000 Summer Olympics
California Golden Bears men's track and field athletes
Georgia Tech Yellow Jackets track and field coaches
Medalists at the 2000 Summer Olympics
Oklahoma Sooners track and field coaches
Olympic bronze medalists for the United States in track and field
Sportspeople from Brooklyn
Track and field athletes from New York City
World Athletics Championships medalists
Pan American Games medalists in athletics (track and field)
Pan American Games gold medalists for the United States
Goodwill Games medalists in athletics
Competitors at the 1998 Goodwill Games
Medalists at the 1999 Pan American Games